Santosh kumar Mitra (Bengali: সন্তোষ কুমার মিত্র) or Santosh Mitra (15 August 1900 – 16 September 1931) was an activist of the Indian independence movement and a martyr.

Early life
Mitra was born on 15 August 1900 in Kolkata, in a middle class  Bengali family. He passed matriculation from Hindu School, Kolkata in 1915 and became graduate from the University of Calcutta in 1919. During the period 1921–22, he completed his M.A and LL.B.

Revolutionary activities
Santosh Mitra joined the Indian National Congress. He founded the Swaraj Sevak Sangha and was attached with Hooghly Vidya Mandir which was headed by Bhupati Majumder, one of the Jugantar Leaders in 1922. He organised a Socialist conference in Kolkata in the presidency of Jawaharlal Nehru. After the suspension of Non-cooperation movement Mitra shifted to the extremist movement in the struggle for Independence. He was charged with Shankharitola Murder Case and arrested in 1923.

Death
On 16 September 1931, police shot and killed Santosh kumar Mitra and another inmate Tarakeswar Sengupta in Hijli Detention Camp.

References

1900 births
1931 deaths
Anti-British establishment revolutionaries from East Bengal
People from Kolkata
Indian revolutionaries
Revolutionary movement for Indian independence
Indian independence activists from West Bengal
University of Calcutta alumni